Shannon Bolt Withem (born September 21, 1972) is a former professional baseball pitcher. He appeared in one game in Major League Baseball for the Toronto Blue Jays on September 18 during the 1998 season. Withem also pitched in Nippon Professional Baseball in 1999.

Amateur career 
Withem attended Willow Run High School in Ypsilanti, Michigan where he was an all-state pitcher for the Flyers baseball team. He had 7 no-hitters in high school and once struck out every batter in a 7-inning no-hitter.

Professional career 
Withem was drafted in the 5th round of the 1990 Major League Baseball draft by the Detroit Tigers. He pitched in the Tigers' organization until 1995, then spent the 1996–97 seasons in the New York Mets farm system. He was signed by the Blue Jays after the 1997 season. After going 17–5 with the Syracuse Chiefs, the Blue Jays' top farm team, he was called up in September. In his lone major league appearance, he pitched three innings in relief of Kelvim Escobar, giving up one run on three hits with two walks and two strikeouts.

After being released by the Blue Jays after the 1998 season, Withem signed with the Hokkaido Nippon-Ham Fighters in 1999. That season, he had a record of 6–7 with a 5.76 earned run average in 17 games. He was re-signed for the 2000 season, but hurt his elbow and did not pitch that season. The injury effectively ended his career, as he never again pitched professionally.

After baseball 
Withem is now a Software Sales Executive in Michigan.

Notes

External links 

1972 births
Living people
American expatriate baseball players in Canada
American expatriate baseball players in Japan
Baseball players from Michigan
Binghamton Mets players
Bristol Tigers players
Fayetteville Generals players
Jacksonville Suns players
Lakeland Tigers players
Major League Baseball pitchers
Nippon Ham Fighters players
Nippon Professional Baseball pitchers
Niagara Falls Rapids players
Trenton Thunder players
St. Lucie Mets players
Syracuse SkyChiefs players
Norfolk Tides players
Toronto Blue Jays players
People from Ypsilanti, Michigan
Sportspeople from Ypsilanti, Michigan